Gene White was one of the original members of the 1954 Milan, Indiana championship basketball team that inspired the film Hoosiers.

At 5'11" White played center for the Milan Indians.  White's family owned a local feed store, and his mother sold some of the family's chickens to fund a trip to Indianapolis for the state championship.  White went on to attend Franklin College where he later taught mathematics and coached basketball.  White also taught second-level algebra and calculus at Franklin Community High School.

References
 Where are they now?. The Indianapolis Star.
 Another shot at Hoosier glory for Milan. USA Today.
 The Stuff Dreams are Made Of. The Cincinnati Enquirer.

External links
Milan '54 Museum, Inc.
Milan Indians 1954 State Champs

Living people
Basketball players from Indiana
Franklin College (Indiana) faculty
Franklin Grizzlies men's basketball players
People from Franklin, Indiana
American men's basketball players
Year of birth missing (living people)